Ivo Kostadinov (born 8 August 1969) is a Bulgarian judoka. He competed in the men's half-lightweight event at the 1988 Summer Olympics.

References

1969 births
Living people
Bulgarian male judoka
Olympic judoka of Bulgaria
Judoka at the 1988 Summer Olympics
Sportspeople from Sofia